Gustavo "Gus" Alberto Barreiro (July 12, 1959 – August 16, 2019)  was a Republican politician from Florida. He served four terms in the Florida House of Representatives, representing the 107th district in Miami-Dade County from 1998 to 2006. His district encompassed parts of Miami, Miami Beach, and Coral Gables.

In 2012, Barreiro ran for the Florida House again, but lost the Republican primary in the 112th district to Alex Díaz de la Portilla, 59 to 41%. He died after a heart attack in 2019.

Controversy
Barreiro was terminated from his position as director of residential facilities for the Florida Department of Juvenile Justice in 2009 after an investigation revealed that he had downloaded 300 to 400 sexually explicit adult porn images onto his state-issued laptop. He also used his computer to log on to the sex hookup site adultfriendfinders.com using the screen name "CubanCigar107." Barreiro claimed he was set up.

Councils/Committee Membership
Criminal Justice Appropriations Committee, Chair
Community Colleges & Workforce Committee
Fiscal Council
Juvenile Justice Committee
Legislative Budget Commission
Utilities & Telecommunications Committee

Legislative Service
Elected to the House in 1998, reelected subsequently.
 Served in The Florida House of Representatives 1998-2006
 Chaired the committee on Juvenile Justice
 Chaired the committee on Crime and punishment
 Chaired the committee on Criminal Justice Appropriations
 Chaired the select committee on the death of Omar Paisley
 Chaired the select committee on the death of Martin Lee Anderson at a Florida Boot Camp

Affiliations
The Children's Trust
Dade Marine Institute executive director
Republican Party of Florida
Defiant Crew Motorcycle Club Vice President
Civil Air Patrol
Guardian Ad Litem
Chair CBC Alliance Board
Co-chair Live Healthy Little Havana

References

External links
Florida House of Representatives

1959 births
2019 deaths
Cuban emigrants to the United States
Republican Party members of the Florida House of Representatives
American politicians of Cuban descent
Mount Senario College alumni
People from Matanzas
Hispanic and Latino American state legislators in Florida